Panopea bitruncata is a species of marine bivalve commonly known as the Atlantic geoduck or Atlantic geoduck clam. These clams like their more famous Pacific relative P. generosa have an enlarged siphon that can extend to great lengths or contract to just barely poke out of the shell. They are generally smaller in comparison to the Pacific species though still constitute a sizable mollusc as they cannot fully retract their siphon.

This species is not very common, and is quite poorly documented which makes study of this species quite a challenge. They are thought to be edible, however, due to their rarity it is best to leave them in the ocean. They vast majority of evidence for this species consists only of shells, few live specimens have ever been found.

Range 
This species is known to range along the Atlantic Coast as far north as Chesapeake Bay and around the Florida Peninsula into the Northern Gulf of Mexico. The species is so poorly documented that it is unknown how far south along the Gulf Coast it ranges, though unconfirmed sightings from the Northern Yucatán Peninsula have been reported.

Ecology 
The clams live in muddy soil and sometimes sand, usually buried deep down with only the tip of the siphon poking out from the substrate. They feed on microscopic organisms suspended in the water column, and water pumped through their siphons is filtered to strain out the organic matter.

References 

 Turgeon, D. D., W. G. Lyons, P. Mikkelsen, G. Rosenberg, and F. Moretzsohn. 2009. Bivalvia (Mollusca) of the Gulf of Mexico, Pp. 711–744 in Felder, D.L. and D.K. Camp (eds.), Gulf of Mexico–Origins, Waters, and Biota. Biodiversity. Texas A&M Press, Colleg
 Huber, M. (2010). Compendium of bivalves. A full-color guide to 3,300 of the world's marine bivalves. A status on Bivalvia after 250 years of research. Hackenheim: ConchBooks. 901 pp., 1 CD-ROM

External links
 Stimpson, W. (1860). Checklist of the Shells of North America. East Coast: Arctic Seas to Georgia. Smithsonian Miscellaneous Collections
 Johnson, C. W. (1904). Panopea bitruncata Conrad. The Nautilus. 18(7): 73-75, pl. 4
 McLean, R. A. (1936). Panope bitruncata Conrad at Sanibel, Florida. The Nautilus. 49(3): 104

Molluscs of the Atlantic Ocean
Molluscs described in 1872
Hiatellidae